Lee Mission Cemetery is a pioneer cemetery in Salem, Oregon, United States.

History
Lee Mission Cemetery was established in 1842 with the burial of Lucy Thompson Lee, the second wife of Rev. Jason Lee. The cemetery's gate has the date 1838, which is date of death for Anna Maria Pittman Lee, first wife of Jason Lee, and their infant son, who were moved to the cemetery shortly after Lucy's burial.

Notable interments
Alanson Beers
Erastus Otis Haven
Gustavus Hines
Hallie Parrish Hinges
Anna Maria Pittman Lee
Rev. Jason Lee
Josiah Lamberson Parrish
Jesse Quinn Thornton
Alvin F. Waller
Edward J. White

References

External links
Lee Mission Cemetery (official website) Includes name search and maps
Lee Mission Cemetery on Facebook Official Facebook page
Lee Mission Cemetery at Find A Grave
Historic images of Lee Mission Cemetery from Salem Public Library

Geography of Salem, Oregon
Cemeteries in Oregon
Methodist Mission in Oregon
Cemeteries on the National Register of Historic Places in Oregon
National Register of Historic Places in Salem, Oregon
Protected areas of Marion County, Oregon
Tourist attractions in Salem, Oregon
1842 establishments in Oregon